Philip or Phil Edwards may refer to:

 Philip Edwards (academic) (1923–2015), British literary scholar
 Phil Edwards (boxer) (born 1936), Welsh boxer
 Philip Edwards (cricketer) (1906–1987), English cricketer active 1930–1933
 Phil Edwards (cricketer) (born 1984), English cricketer
 Phil Edwards (cyclist) (1949–2017), British road racing cyclist
 Phil Edwards (footballer) (born 1985), English footballer
 Phillip Edwards (Royal Navy officer) (1927–2014), British admiral
 Phil Edwards (runner) (1907–1971), Canadian and Guyanese track and field athlete 
 Phil Edwards (surfer) (born 1938), surfer
 Philip Leget Edwards (1812–1869), American educator